Eta Arae, Latinized from η Arae, is the Bayer designation for a single
 star in the southern constellation of Ara. The star is moving away from the Sun with a radial velocity of +9 km/s.

The spectrum of this star matches a stellar classification of K5 III, indicating that, at an estimated age of five billion years, it has reached the giant star stage of its evolution. With 1.12 times the mass of the Sun, it has an outer envelope that has expanded to 40 times the Sun's radius. The star is now spinning so slowly that it takes more than eleven years to complete a single rotation. Eta Arae is radiating energy into space from its photosphere with 575 times the Sun's luminosity at an effective temperature of 4,147 K, giving it the orange-hued glow of a K-type star.

It has a magnitude 13.5 optical companion, located 23.4 arcseconds away along a position angle of 118°, as of 2000.

References

External links
 HR 6229
 Image Eta Arae

151249
Arae, Eta
Ara (constellation)
K-type giants
082363
6229
Durchmusterung objects